Decachaeta is a genus of Mesoamerican flowering plants in the family Asteraceae.

 Species
 Decachaeta haenkeana DC. - Chihuahua, Sonora, Sinaloa, Colima, Guerrero, Michoacán, Nayarit, Oaxaca, Jalisco
 Decachaeta incompta (DC.) R.M.King & H.Rob. - Chiapas, Oaxaca, Colima, Guerrero, Michoacán, México State, Jalisco, Puebla
 Decachaeta ovandensis (Grashoff & Beaman) R.M.King & H.Rob. - Chiapas
 Decachaeta ovatifolia (DC.) R.M.King & H.Rob. - Guerrero, Michoacán, México State, Jalisco, Nayarit
 Decachaeta perornata (Klatt) R.M.King & H.Rob.	- Chiapas, Oaxaca, Michoacán, México State, Jalisco, Puebla, Veracruz, Hidalgo
 Decachaeta scabrella (B.L.Rob.) R.M.King & H.Rob. - Chihuahua, Sinaloa, Colima, Michoacán, Nayarit, Jalisco, Durango, Sonora, Guerrero
 Decachaeta thieleana (Klatt ex Klatt) R.M.King & H.Rob. - Costa Rica, Panama, Honduras

References

Eupatorieae
Asteraceae genera
Flora of North America